Omkara or onkara can mean:
 A name for the sound or syllable Om, or its corresponding character in Indian scripts, considered sacred in major Indian religions
 Used to denote Brahman in some Hindu texts
 Omkara (2004 film), a 2004 Indian Kannada film
 Omkara (2006 film), a 2006 Indian Hindi film adapted from the William Shakespeare play Othello

See also 
 Ik Onkar